Enoploceras is a Tainoceratid genus, a nautiloid cephalopod in the order Nautilida, known from Triassic sediments in Europe, India, Timor, and the state of Idaho.

Enoploceras is characterised by its moderately involute shell with a broad subquadrarte whorl section; venter and flanks flattened; ventral and umbilical shoulders sharply rounded; flanks with nodes at ventral or umbilical shoulders or both, and with radial ribs and sinuous growth lines; umbilicus deep, straight walled, and with small perforation. The siphuncle is subcentral.  Sutures form shallow lobes on the venter, flanks and dorsum.

Enoploceras is like Anoploceras in that both have a broad subquadrate, wider than high, whorl section but differs in that Anoploceras has conspicuous ribs while Enoploceras has primarily nodes.

References
Bernhard Kummel, 1964.  Nautiloidea-Nautilida. Treatise on Invertebrate Paleontology, Part K. Geological Soc. of America and University of Kansas press. Teichert and Moore (eds)

Nautiloids
Prehistoric nautiloid genera